Niphonympha dealbatella is a moth of the family Yponomeutidae. It is found in France, Germany, the Czech Republic, Austria, Switzerland, Italy, Slovakia, Hungary, Romania and on Corsica and Sicily. It is also found in Turkey.

References

Moths described in 1847
Yponomeutidae
Moths of Europe
Moths of Asia